The 1970 American League Championship Series was a match-up between the East Division champion Baltimore Orioles and the West Division champion Minnesota Twins. Like the year before, the Orioles swept the Twins three games to none. The Orioles went on to win the World Series against the Cincinnati Reds.

(Note: Owing to a one-day strike by major league umpires, the series was begun using AL supervisor Berry, veteran umpire Stevens—who had been used in a substitute capacity in 1970—and minor league umpires Deegan and Satchell, with the regularly assigned crew returning for Games 2 and 3.)

Summary

Baltimore Orioles vs. Minnesota Twins

Game summaries

Game 1

Baltimore only had to use their bullpen once in the series when Dick Hall came on to relieve Mike Cuellar in Game 1. Dave McNally and Jim Palmer both pitched complete games in Games 2 and 3.

The Twins enjoyed the lead only once, a 1–0 edge in Game 1 when César Tovar hit a leadoff single in the first, moved to second on a sacrifice bunt, and scored on Harmon Killebrew's single. In the second, Mark Belanger's bases-loaded groundout aided by an error put the Orioles up 2–1. The Twins' tied the score in the bottom of the inning on Jim Perry's groundout with runners on first and third, but the Orioles put the game out of reach in the fourth inning, aided by Cuellar's bat and the lusty blasts of a strong wind blowing across Metropolitan Stadium. Two singles and Brooks Robinson's sacrifice fly produced one fourth-inning run off Jim Perry, the Twins' 24-game winner, and the Orioles loaded the bases with one out after two more singles.

The lefthanded-hitting Cuellar, with a .089 batting average and 7 RBIs to show for his season's efforts, then pulled a Perry pitch toward foul territory in right field. As the ball passed first base it was patently foul. Cuellar himself stood transfixed at the plate, watching the pellet transcribe a high parabola in the direction of the right-field seats. As the ball soared into the 29-mile-an-hour current, however, it started drifting toward fair territory. Cuellar started jogging from the plate. By the time he arrived at first base, the wind had worked its devilry against the home forces, depositing the ball over the fence in fair territory, and giving Cuellar a grand slam. Then Don Buford cuffed Perry for a knock-out home run and reliever Bill Zepp yielded a left-field round-tripper to southpaw-swinging Boog Powell to complete the seven-run outburst.

The Twins got a run in the bottom of the inning on Tovar's single with two on. Next inning, Killebrew's leadoff home run made it 9–4. After a double, walk, and groundout, George Mitterwald's two-run single cut the lead to 9–6 and knock Cueller out of the game. Hall, a 40-year-old relief specialist, allowed only one hit in the final  innings to pick up the victory. The Orioles got one more run in the sixth on Powell's RBI single off of Stan Williams with the run charged to Dick Woodson.

Game 2

Dave McNally received the second-game assignment and once again delivered another great pitching performance en route to another O's victory. The Orioles handed McNally a four-run cushion. Boog Powell doubled home Mark Belanger in the first inning after two leadoff walks, Frank Robinson homered with Belanger aboard in the third and McNally himself singled home Andy Etchebarren in the fourth. The Twins nearly erased the lead with two swings of the bat in the bottom half, Harmon Killebrew connecting for a home run after a walk to Leo Cárdenas followed by a Tony Oliva home run.

Stan Williams, following Tom Hall and Bill Zepp to the mound, blanked Baltimore the next three frames and Ron Perranoski zeroed the visitors in the eighth before the East Division champs soon erupted for another big rally of runs. They scored seven runs in the inning to tie the record for most runs scored in the ninth inning of a postseason game, which had been done once before in 1936. After a double, single and walk loaded the bases with one out, Boog Powell drove in two runs with a double to left, then Merv Rettenmund drove in another with a single. Luis Tiant relieved Perranoski as Brooks Robinson reached on an error that allowed Powell to score before Davey Johnson's three-run home run capped the scoring at 11–3 Orioles. McNally pitched a complete game to give the Orioles a 2–0 series lead.

Game 3

When the series shifted to Baltimore, Earl Weaver called on his workhouse Jim Palmer to wrap it all up. The big righthander, just 10 days short of his 25th birthday and two years removed from an arm ailment that threatened his career, was razor sharp, scattering seven hits. In fairness, Palmer was entitled to a shutout. A brilliant sun blinded Frank Robinson while he was tracking down César Tovar's fifth-inning fly that fell for a single. Cardenas' single produced a run after a triple, but that was all for the Twins.

A 20-game winner with a 2.71 ERA in regular season, Palmer set a personal career high of 12 strikeouts and issued only three walks. He also laced a double and figured prominently in the second-inning Oriole run when his blooper to short center field was misplayed for a two-base error. Palmer subsequently scored on Buford's single. The Twins starting assignment went to Jim Kaat, a 14-game winner who had been handicapped by late-season arm miseries. The Orioles struck first when Don Buford singled to lead off the first, moved to second on a sacrifice bunt, then to third on a fly out before scoring on Boog Powell's single. The left-hander departed with two on and none out in the third after yielding six hits. Andy Etchebarren's fielder's choice off of Bert Blyleven aided by an error allowed one to score. After a force out, Palmer's RBI double and Buford's sacrifice fly made it 5–0 Orioles. The Orioles got one more run in the seventh on Davey Johnson's home run off of Jim Perry. By that time the trend of the game had been established and three successors, while more effective, were helpless to change the outcome, the Birds cruising to an easy victory and the AL pennant.

The Orioles played flawless defense in the series, handling 110 total chances (81 putouts, 29 assists) perfectly.

Composite line score
1970 ALCS (3–0): Baltimore Orioles over Minnesota Twins

Aftermath
The Orioles, who had made it to the inaugural ALCS held the previous year, would continue their run the following year to mark three consecutive ALCS appearances on their way to what ultimately became five appearances in six seasons (1969–71, 1973–74), with Baltimore winning three in a row (which was tied by threeteam before being surpassed by the 1998-2001 New York Yankees).

For all of their promising talent (having won the pennant in 1965 to go with two further playoff appearances, which came despite having seen three managers fired in three years), this was the second straight loss in the ALCS for the Twins. They soon went into a tailspin that clouded them for a decade until they returned to the ALCS 17 years later.

References

External links
1970 ALCS at Baseball-Reference.com

American League Championship Series
American League Championship Series
Minnesota Twins postseason
Baltimore Orioles postseason
American League Championship Series
American League Championship Series
1970s in Baltimore
1970s in Minneapolis
American League Championship Series